Chingaza Dam is a large dam in Colombia which supplies water to the capital city of Bogotá. The dam is gravel fill with a concrete face. Behind the dam, the Chuza Reservoir holds .

Etymology 
The name Chingaza comes from Chibcha and means "middle of the width".

History of conflict 
In January 2002, rebels of the Revolutionary Armed Forces of Colombia (FARC) damaged the dam in an act of terrorism by placing an explosive on a gate valve in one of the dam's tunnels.

References 

Dams in Colombia
Dams completed in 1983
Buildings and structures in Cundinamarca Department